Antonios Gryllos (1917 – 1993) was a Greek wrestler. He competed in the men's Greco-Roman featherweight at the 1948 Summer Olympics.

References

External links
 

1917 births
1993 deaths
Greek male sport wrestlers
Olympic wrestlers of Greece
Wrestlers at the 1948 Summer Olympics
Place of birth missing
20th-century Greek people